Thikkodi is a small village near Koyilandy in Kozhikode district of Kerala state, south India. Thikkodi is famous for a coconut nursery, which is 100 years old. The nearest city is Kozhikode, which is 35 km from this village.

One can see remains of an old lighthouse in Velliyamkallu in Thikkodi. Thikkodi is also famous for its mussels (kallumakaaya).

Thikkodi is the birthplace of well known Malayalam author P. Kunhananandan Nair, better known by his pen name Thikodiyan. He was a multi-faceted personality. 

Description of the area and people of Thikkodi and surrounding geographical areas can be seen in the works of the Award Winning story teller U. A. Khader. His work Thrikotooor Peruma has portrayed the history and geography of the area very well.

Demographics
 India census, Thikkody had a population of 25015 with 11796 males and 13219 females.

Religious places
There are big temples like Palur Mahavishnu, Thrikkottoor Maha Ganapathi, Perumalpuram Shiva and Thrikkottoor Shree Krishna.  Muslims worship in places like Thikkodi Meethale Palli, Thikkodi Kodikkal Juamath Palli.

Institutions
 GVHSS PAYYOLI
 Thrikkottur A.U.P School
 Paloor LP School
 Thrikkottur West Government LP School
 Mappila L.P. School, Thikkodi Panchayath Bazar

Transportation
Thikkodi village connects to other parts of India through Koyilandy town.  The nearest airports are at Calicut and Kannur.  The nearest main railway station is at Koyilandy . A small railway station at Thikkodi also serves a few slow trains.  The national highway no.66 passes through Koyilandy and the northern stretch connects to Mangalore, Goa and Mumbai.  The southern stretch connects to Cochin and Trivandrum.  The eastern National Highway No.54 going through Kuttiady connects to Mananthavady, Mysore and Bangalore.

See also
 Nadapuram
 Thottilpalam
 Perambra
 Madappally
 Villiappally
 Memunda
 Iringal
 Mahe, Pondicherry
 Payyoli
 Orkkatteri

References

External links

Koyilandy area